Wellington Ferreira Nascimento, known as Wellington (born 1 March 1995) is a Brazilian footballer who plays for Avaí.

Club career
He made his professional debut in the Campeonato Brasileiro Série B for Vila Nova on 22 November 2014 in a game against ABC.

Career statistics

References

External links

1995 births
Living people
Brazilian footballers
Vila Nova Futebol Clube players
Trindade Atlético Clube players
Centro Sportivo Alagoano players
Avaí FC players
Brazilian expatriate sportspeople in Portugal
Expatriate footballers in Portugal
Brazilian expatriate sportspeople in Turkey
Expatriate footballers in Turkey
Brazilian expatriate sportspeople in Cyprus
Expatriate footballers in Cyprus
Leixões S.C. players
Liga Portugal 2 players
İstanbulspor footballers
TFF First League players
Apollon Limassol FC players
Cypriot First Division players
Association football defenders